Cove Forge is a  census-designated place (CDP) in Blair County, Pennsylvania, United States. It includes the unincorporated community of Covedale. Cove Forge was first listed as a CDP prior to the 2020 census.

The CDP is in eastern Blair County, in the northeastern part of Woodbury Township. It is bordered to the southeast by Fisherville, to the northwest by the Frankstown Branch of the Juniata River, and to the east by the west base of Tussey Mountain.

Covedale Road leads southwest (upriver)  to the borough of Williamsburg and east over Tussey Mountain  to Huntingdon.

Demographics

References 

Census-designated places in Blair County, Pennsylvania
Census-designated places in Pennsylvania